Ganter Bridge is a multi-span reinforced-concrete road bridge that is the second longest spanning bridge in Switzerland after Poya Bridge. It was designed by renowned Swiss civil engineer Christian Menn and completed in 1980. It is notable for its innovative design and its stylish geometric profile in its spectacular Alpine setting.

Design 

Its innovative design combines elements of a cable-stayed bridge and a prestressed cantilever hollow-box girder bridge, which has become to be referred to as an extradosed bridge.  The Ganter Bridge is the first of its type to use triangular concrete walls above the roadway to encase the prestressed cable-stays into sails, which protects the cables from corrosion and gives the bridge a distinctive stylish geometric appearance.  From some drivers' view, these triangular concrete walls plus the one across the top of the towers made the main span feel too much like a tunnel entrance.  Whatever its pros and cons, the innovative and unique Ganter Bridge is one of Switzerland's ground-breaking bridges. In the words of David P. Billington: “Ganter bridge ... represents one of those rare events where a new form arises”.

Construction 

Construction began in 1976. The locations of the piers were based on geological conditions as well as symmetry and uniformity of span lengths. The shaft for pier P4 was approximately 40m deep. The south valley side was susceptible to creep movement, so the feet of the south valley piers P4 to P7 were mounted on pot bearings and regularly monitored. After the piers were complete, the balanced free cantilever construction method was employed.  By autumn 1979, the entire substructure and approximately 60% of superstructure were complete.  By December 1980 the construction was completed on schedule.

Between 2006 and 2008 the Ganter Bridge was given a complete rehabilitation as the piers on the south side of the bridge had shifted 105mm southward.  Measures were taken to address further movement of the south side piers.

References 
 Billington, David P. The Tower and the Bridge. Princeton University Press, Princeton, USA, 1983. 
 Billington, David P. The Art of Structural Design: A Swiss Legacy. Princeton University Art Museum. Princeton, USA, 2003. .

Notes

External links 

 

Extradosed bridges
Extradosed bridges in Switzerland
Road bridges in Switzerland
Bridges completed in 1980
Cable-stayed bridges in Switzerland
20th-century architecture in Switzerland